Navasota leuconeurella is a species of snout moth in the genus Navasota. It was described by George Hampson in 1918 and is known from South Africa and Uganda.

References

Moths described in 1918
Anerastiini